One Night for Love or Appointment With an Unknown Woman is a 1968 Greek black and white drama film directed and written by Vasilis Georgiadis and starring Elena Nathanail, Giannis Voglis and Dimitris Murat.  It was produced by Damaskinos-Michailidis.

Cast
Giannis Voglis ..... Alexis
Elena Nathanael ..... Christina
Dimitris Myrat ..... Christina's husband
Lykourgos Kallergis ..... judge
Periklis Christoforidis ..... police captain
Anne Lonnberg ..... Eirini
Vasilis Andreopoulos ..... lawyer
Eva Angelidou ..... Katerina

Awards

The film was awarded Best Actress at the 1968 Thessaloniki Film Festival.

Information

Also known as: Gia/Yia mia nychta/nihta erota (Για μια νύχτα έρωτα)
Other titles:
Greek: Ραντεβού με μια άγνωστη
Italian: Appuntamento con una sconoscuita
Tickets: 70,280 (74th out of 108 films that year)

External links

One Night for Love

1968 films
1960s Greek-language films
1968 drama films
Films directed by Vasilis Georgiadis
Greek drama films